Naeyeonsan is a mountain of Gyeongsangbuk-do in eastern South Korea. It has an elevation of 710 metres.

See also
List of mountains of Korea

References

Mountains of South Korea
Mountains of North Gyeongsang Province
Taebaek Mountains